Peccenini is an Italian surname. Notable people with the surname include:

Franco Peccenini (born 1953), Italian footballer
Luigi Peccenini (born 1939), Italian businessman, educator, and speaker

Italian-language surnames